In mathematics, the Babuška–Lax–Milgram theorem is a generalization of the famous Lax–Milgram theorem, which gives conditions under which a bilinear form can be "inverted" to show the existence and uniqueness of a weak solution to a given boundary value problem.  The result is named after the mathematicians Ivo Babuška, Peter Lax and Arthur Milgram.

Background
In the modern, functional-analytic approach to the study of partial differential equations, one does not attempt to solve a given partial differential equation directly, but by using the structure of the vector space of possible solutions, e.g. a Sobolev space W k,p.  Abstractly, consider two real normed spaces U and V with their continuous dual spaces U∗ and V∗ respectively.  In many applications, U is the space of possible solutions; given some partial differential operator Λ : U → V∗ and a specified element f ∈ V∗, the objective is to find a u ∈ U such that

However, in the weak formulation, this equation is only required to hold when "tested" against all other possible elements of V.  This "testing" is accomplished by means of a bilinear function B : U × V → R which encodes the differential operator Λ; a weak solution to the problem is to find a u ∈ U such that

The achievement of Lax and Milgram in their 1954 result was to specify sufficient conditions for this weak formulation to have a unique solution that depends continuously upon the specified datum f ∈ V∗: it suffices that U = V is a Hilbert space, that B is continuous, and that B is strongly coercive, i.e.

for some constant c > 0 and all u ∈ U.

For example, in the solution of the Poisson equation on a bounded, open domain Ω ⊂ Rn,

the space U could be taken to be the Sobolev space H01(Ω) with dual H−1(Ω); the former is a subspace of the Lp space V = L2(Ω); the bilinear form B associated to −Δ is the L2(Ω) inner product of the derivatives:

Hence, the weak formulation of the Poisson equation, given f ∈ L2(Ω), is to find uf such that

Statement of the theorem

In 1971, Babuška provided the following generalization of Lax and Milgram's earlier result, which begins by dispensing with the requirement that U and V be the same space.  Let U and V be two real Hilbert spaces and let B : U × V → R be a continuous bilinear functional.  Suppose also that B is weakly coercive: for some constant c > 0 and all u ∈ U,

and, for all 0 ≠ v ∈ V, 

Then, for all f ∈ V∗, there exists a unique solution u = uf ∈ U to the weak problem

Moreover, the solution depends continuously on the given data:

See also

 Lions–Lax–Milgram theorem

References

External links
 

Theorems in analysis
Partial differential equations